Aliceville Elementary and High School, also known as the Millionaire Public School, is a historic school building in Aliceville, Pickens County, Alabama.  It was completed in 1913 and opened as the Aliceville
Public School with 130 students and six teachers.  It became the Aliceville Elementary School in 1929, when a separate building was built for the high school.  It was extensively remodeled in 1934, which included the removal of the second story. It continued to house the elementary school until 1954.  It served various purposes after that, including housing the library and county health department.  The school was listed on the National Register of Historic Places on May 9, 1980.

References

School buildings on the National Register of Historic Places in Alabama
School buildings completed in 1913
Defunct schools in Alabama
Schools in Pickens County, Alabama
National Register of Historic Places in Pickens County, Alabama
1913 establishments in Alabama